The 2018–19 FIU Panthers men's basketball team represented Florida International University during the 2018–19 NCAA Division I men's basketball season. The Panthers, led by first-year head coach Jeremy Ballard, played their home games at Ocean Bank Convocation Center in Miami, Florida as members of Conference USA.

Previous season 
The Panthers finished the 2017–18 season 14–18, 8–10 in C-USA play to finish in a tie for seventh place. They lost in the first round of the C-USA tournament to Southern Miss.

On April 2, 2018, FIU fired head coach Anthony Evans after five seasons. On April 20, the school announced VCU associate head coach Jeremy Ballard was hired as the new head coach.

Offseason

Departures

Incoming transfers

Recruiting class of 2018

Recruiting class of 2019

Roster

Schedule and results

|-
!colspan=12 style=| Non-conference regular season

|-
!colspan=12 style=| Conference USA regular season

|-
!colspan=12 style=| Conference USA tournament

|-
!colspan=12 style=|CollegeInsider.com Postseason tournament

References

FIU Panthers men's basketball seasons
Florida International
FIU Panthers men's b
FIU Panthers men's b
Fiu